Hawksbeard is a common name for several plants and may refer to:

Crepis, a cosmopolitan plant genus
Youngia, an Asiatic plant genus